Nytva is a town and the administrative center of Nytvensky District in Perm Krai, Russia, located on the Nytva River near its confluence with the Kama,  west of Perm, the administrative center of the krai. Population:

Etymology
"Nytva" can mean green water in the Komi-Permyak language and silt water in the Mansi language.

History
The village of Nytva was first mentioned in 1623.

In 1756 the Nytvensky copper smelting plant was built. Its founder is considered to be Maria Stroganova.  By the end of the 1780s, the factory had become an ironworks and rolling mill. A quay and shipyard were built on the river. At the factory anchors and hammers were produced.

In 1913 railway was laid.

In 1928 Nytva gained a status of worker settlement. The status of city was obtained on June 19, 1942.

Administrative and municipal status
Within the framework of administrative divisions, Nytva serves as the administrative center of Nytvensky District, to which it is directly subordinated. As a municipal division, the town of Nytvensky, together with eight rural localities, is incorporated within Nytvensky Municipal District as Nytvenskoye Urban Settlement.

Culture
The Nytva Museum of Local History was established in 1958. One of its most interesting exhibitions is the Spoon Museum, whose collection includes over 1,700 various spoon items from fifty-seven countries.

References

Notes

Sources

Cities and towns in Perm Krai
Populated places in Nytvensky District
Okhansky Uyezd
1942 establishments in the Soviet Union
Monotowns in Russia